Franklin Township is the name of some places in the U.S. state of New Jersey:
Franklin Township, Gloucester County, New Jersey
Franklin Township, Hunterdon County, New Jersey
Franklin Township, Somerset County, New Jersey
Franklin Township, Warren County, New Jersey
Franklin Township, Bergen County, New Jersey (defunct)
Franklin Township, Essex County, New Jersey, now known as Nutley, New Jersey

See also
Franklin, New Jersey in Sussex County
Franklin Lakes, New Jersey
Franklin Township (disambiguation)

New Jersey township disambiguation pages